Anthony Chinn (1930 – 22 October 2000) was a Guyanese actor based in England who appeared in over 50 films and television series throughout a career which spanned more than four decades.

Career and death
Chinn was born in Georgetown, Guyana. He made his film début in the United Kingdom in 1957. He moved to London in 1961 and for the next several years appeared in British TV series such as The Avengers, Danger Man, The Protectors and Steptoe and Son, as well as two  episodes of Gerry Anderson's UFO.

Chinn also had early uncredited roles in the James Bond films Dr. No (1962), Goldfinger (1964) and You Only Live Twice (1967), later playing a Taiwanese businessman in A View to a Kill (1985). Chinn played the Kitai in John Huston's The Kremlin Letter (1969), a Chinese assassin in The Pink Panther Strikes Again (1976) and a Chinese doorman in Revenge of the Pink Panther (1978). He appeared as Mohan in Raiders of the Lost Ark (1981) and as Mactilburgh's technician in The Fifth Element (1997).

Chinn also worked in theatre and appeared in TV advertisements for brands such as McEwan's beer. He was hospitalised with a serious and life threatening brain bleed on 21 October 2000 and died from the haemorrhage the next day at a London hospital. The Guyanese actor was buried in North London and was survived by his four sons and two grandchildren.

Selected filmography

 Yangtse Incident: The Story of H.M.S. Amethyst (1957) - Chinese People's Liberation Army Officer
 The Abominable Snowman (1957) - Majordomo 
 The Camp on Blood Island (1958) - Japanese Sentry (uncredited)
 Next to No Time (1958)
 The Savage Innocents (1960) - Kiddok
 The Long and the Short and the Tall (1961) - Japanese Sniper (uncredited)
 Satan Never Sleeps (1962) - Ho San's Driver (uncredited)
 Dr. No (1962) - Chen, Descontamination Technician (uncredited)
 Tarzan's Three Challenges (1963) - Tor
 Goldfinger (1964) - Servant at Stud Farm (uncredited)
 A Countess from Hong Kong (1967) - Hawaiian
 You Only Live Twice (1967) - SPECTRE Guard (uncredited)
 Pretty Polly (1967) - Japanese Proprietor
 The Chairman (1969) - Chinese Officer 
 Doppelgänger (1969) - Mongolian Rescue Crew Member (uncredited)
 The Gamblers (1970) - Nono
 The Kremlin Letter (1970) - Kitai
 Craze (1974) - Customer (uncredited)
 Rollerball (1975) - Reporter (uncredited)
 The Pink Panther Strikes Again (1976) - Chinese Assassin
 Revenge of the Pink Panther (1978) - Chinese Doorman
 Mihail, câine de circ (1979) 
 Raiders of the Lost Ark (1981) - Mohan
 High Road to China (1983) - General Wong
 The Optimist (1984) - Chinese spy
 A View to a Kill (1985) - Taiwanese Tycoon
 The Fifth Element (1997) - Mactilburgh's Technician

References

External links

Anthony Chinn at asianstarz.com
Anthony Chinn at avelyman.com

1930 births
2000 deaths
20th-century British male actors
20th-century Guyanese male actors
British actors of Latin American descent
British male actors of Chinese descent
British people of Brazilian descent
British people of Chinese descent
Guyanese emigrants to England
Guyanese people of Chinese descent
Guyanese people of Brazilian descent
People from Georgetown, Guyana